Kanjirappuzha may refer to:
 Kanjirappuzha (Mannarkkad), a tributary of the Thuthapuzha river, Kerala state, India
 Kanjirapuzha Dam
 Kanjirappuzha (Nilambur), a tributary of the Chaliyar river, Kerala state, India